Cow and Chicken is an American animated comedy television series created by David Feiss for Cartoon Network and distributed by Warner Bros. Domestic Television Distribution. It is the third of the network's Cartoon Cartoons. It follows the surreal adventures of two talking animal siblings, Cow and Chicken. They are often antagonized by the Red Guy, a cartoon version of the Devil who poses as various characters to scam them.

The original pilot appeared as an episode of the animation showcase series What a Cartoon!. The popularity of the original short allowed Hanna-Barbera to give it the green light for a full series, which premiered on July 15, 1997. Originally, Cow and Chicken was attached to another segment called I Am Weasel, which was later spun-off into its own half-hour series on June 10, 1999. The series was produced by Hanna-Barbera Cartoons. In fact, along with I Am Weasel, it is the last original Cartoon Network show to be entirely produced by Hanna-Barbera Cartoons. It was nominated for two Emmy Awards.

Premise
The series focuses on the misadventures of two unlikely yet somehow biological siblings: the sweet-natured, dim, ecstatic, anthropomorphic 7-year-old Cow and her cynical 11-year-old older brother Chicken (both voiced by Charlie Adler). The two are often caught in escapades with their flamboyant enemy, the Red Guy (Adler), a comical version of the Devil himself who disguises himself under various personas to attempt to either scam them or take them to Hell.

Supporting characters include Chicken and Cow's delirious human parents Dad and Mom (Dee Bradley Baker and Candi Milo, respectively), only seen from the waist down and implied to have no torsos, heads, or arms; Chicken's best friends Flem (Howard Morris) and Earl (Dan Castellaneta); and their cousin, Boneless Chicken (Adler). Cow has her favorite dolls, Crabs the Warthog, Piles the Beaver, and Manure the Bear, who is a polar bear.

The series draws on eccentric, surreal, grotesque, and repulsive humor. For example, Cow and Chicken always order "pork butts and taters" in the cafeteria, the Red Guy always shows his butt, and characters often pepper their speech with malapropisms and sarcasm. The humor and storylines depicted are often based on traditional childhood worries, anxieties, or phobias such as cooties or venturing into the girls' restroom, but enhanced comically.

Many of the slapstick antics involve the main characters getting physically abused.

Production

Development
David Feiss first created Cow and Chicken as a story for his daughter. Feiss was an animator who had worked with Hanna-Barbera and related projects since 1978.

Years later, Feiss was called to submit ideas for What a Cartoon!, a series of various animated shorts from numerous creators and writers, created by Hanna-Barbera president Fred Seibert. Feiss submitted three ideas to executive producer Larry Huber, one of which was Cow and Chicken. Cow and Chicken premiered on What a Cartoon! in 1995. Later, Hanna-Barbera decided to turn Cow and Chicken into a full series, following many letters from fans asking for more.

Voice actors
A single actor, Charlie Adler, voiced the three leading roles of Cow, Chicken, and the Red Guy. Supporting voices included Candi Milo and Dee Bradley Baker as Mom and Dad, and Dan Castellaneta and Howard Morris as Earl and Flem.

Guest stars included Feiss, Will Ferrell, Carlos Alazraqui, Tom Kenny, Jill Talley, Dom DeLuise, Michael Gough, Mark Hamill, Jess Harnell, Pamela Adlon, and many others.

Episodes

Cow and Chicken has a total of 52 episodes in 4 seasons that were produced from July 1997 to July 1999. Each half-hour contains 2 Cow and Chicken and 1 I Am Weasel segment. Cow and Chicken premiered as a full half-hour on July 15, 1997. The series ran for 52 episodes through 1999. As a supporting segment, the show included a cartoon called I Am Weasel; this segment was spun off as an independent series that premiered on June 10, 1999. Typically, an episode would consist of two seven-minute Cow and Chicken shorts playing back-to-back, then followed by a seven-minute I Am Weasel short before the end credits. The exception to this structure was episode 105 ("The Ugliest Weenie"), which had the Weasel short ("I Are Big Star") play in-between the two Cow and Chicken shorts, possibly because said shorts were one storyline.

"Buffalo Gals" controversy
The second season segment "Buffalo Gals", first paired with "Cow and Chicken Reclining", was banned by Cartoon Network after receiving one letter of complaint from a parent about the episode's visual and verbal innuendo about the titular biker group being lesbians. In the segment, the Buffalo Gals break into people's homes to chew on the carpet, a biker named Munch Kelly has a carpet swatch for a calling card, and when Dad freaks out over the Buffalo Gals in the house, Mom says, "They're not after you." In addition, the Buffalo Gals play softball and talk about pitching and catching. Although "Buffalo Gals" only aired once on June 27, 1998, "Buffalo Gals" has been replaced with "Orthodontic Police" in future airings, including on Netflix streaming and reruns on Boomerang. The episode was also discussed on an installment of Rob Paulsen's Talkin' Toons special featuring Cow and Chicken creator David Feiss and voice actor Charlie Adler when an audience member asked why "Buffalo Gals" only aired once.

Awards and nominations

Other media
Cow makes a cameo in the beginning of The Grim Adventures of Billy & Mandy episode "Herbicidal Maniac" giving General Skarr fertilizer.

During the Mad episode "Once Upon a Toon", Cow and Chicken are among the classic cartoon characters reunited in a spoof of ABC's Once Upon a Time.

The two main characters, Cow and Chicken, made cameo appearances as aliens in Ben 10: Omniverse. They were the second Cartoon Network characters to make cameo appearances in the Ben 10 franchise, Billy from The Grim Adventures of Billy & Mandy being the first. Adler reprised his roles for the cameo.

In the OK K.O.! Let's Be Heroes episode "Crossover Nexus", Chicken and I.M. Weasel (with Michael Dorn reprising his role as Weasel for a speaking cameo) made  cameo appearances as two of the Cartoon Network heroes that were summoned by Strike, and also Cow (as SuperCow) appears as one of the Cartoon Network heroes that Ben Tennyson (Ben 10) shapeshifts into.

Home media
Cow and Chicken: Season 1, a two-disc set featuring the complete first season which contains 13 complete episodes, was released by Madman Entertainment in Australia (Region 4 PAL) on September 12, 2007. Season 2 came out on February 10, 2010, by the same company in Australia. The entire series got partially released on DVD in Thailand as 4 season sets, containing Thai and English audio, with the segment "Buffalo Gals" banned from these releases.

The video game Cartoon Network Racing contains the episodes "Black Sheep of the Family" and "Child Star" (PS2 version only) as unlockable extras.

All 4 seasons were released on iTunes and Amazon as of August 16, 2018.

American releases
 Cartoon Network Halloween - 9 Creepy Capers: "Cow with Four Eyes" (August 10, 2004)
 Cartoon Network Christmas - Yuletide Follies: "Me an' My Dog" (October 5, 2004)

Video games
Cow, Chicken, and the Red Guy are playable characters in the 2006 racing game Cartoon Network Racing, which released on the PlayStation 2 and Nintendo DS. The PlayStation 2 version includes Flem and Earl as playable characters.

Cow/Supercow, Chicken, and the Red Guy are playable characters in the kart racing video game Cartoon Network Speedway, which released on the Game Boy Advance in North America on November 17, 2003.

In the online video game FusionFall, one of the character items is based on Cow and Chicken. Cow and Chicken's cousin, Boneless Chicken, can also be seen on a billboard in the game. Though not in the game, Cow is seen as Supercow as a statue at Mt. Neverest.

See also
 I Am Weasel
 Cartoon Cartoons
 List of works produced by Hanna-Barbera Productions
 The Shnookums and Meat Funny Cartoon Show
 The Ren & Stimpy Show

Notes

References

External links

  at Cartoon Network's Department of Cartoons
 
 
 

1997 American television series debuts
1999 American television series endings
1990s American animated television series
1990s American surreal comedy television series
American children's animated adventure television series
American children's animated comedy television series
Animated television series about children
Animated television series about siblings
Animation controversies in television
Best Animated Short Subject Annie Award winners
Cartoon Cartoons
Cartoon Network original programming
Comedy franchises
Cross-dressing in television
Fiction about the Devil
Fictional duos
English-language television shows
LGBT-related controversies in animation
LGBT-related controversies in television
LGBT-related controversies in the United States
Television controversies in the United States
Television series about cattle
Television series about chickens
Television series by Hanna-Barbera
Television series created by David Feiss